Armanitola is an area in the old city of Dhaka, the capital and largest city of Bangladesh. The area takes its name from the Armenian settlement that surrounded Armenian church there.

First Public Meeting at Armanitola Maidan
The first public meeting of Awami Muslim League was held on 11 October at Armanitola Maidan. Muslim League workers were preventing this meeting. Even Bangabandhu Sheikh Mujibur Rahman failed to convince the workers of Muslim League to get a microphone. Suddenly, Yar Mohammad Khan of Rai Shaheb Bazar intervened as Sheikh Mujibur Rahman requested him. Yar Mohammad raised his fist and hit the Muslim League workers and took the microphone. Huge followers of Yar Mohammad joined from Rai Shaheb Bazar and kicked out the Muslim league for good. This incident was enough to establish Awami League in Dhaka city.

Attractions
 The Armenian Church of the Holy Resurrection
 Tara Masjid
 List of Armenian ethnic enclaves

References

Old Dhaka
Neighbourhoods in Dhaka
Populated places in Dhaka Division
Bangladesh
Ethnic enclaves in Asia